Simbad robot simulator is an open-source cross-platform software simulator used to develop robotics and artificial intelligence applications.  The Simbad project started in 2005, initially developed by Dr. Louis Hugues and is widely used for educational purposes. Simbad is distributed under the GNU General Public License. It is written in Java language and enables users to develop robot controllers in a simulated 3D environment.

References

External links 
 

Free simulation software
Robotics simulation software
2005 software
2005 in robotics